Trenche may refer to:

Canada
 Lac de la Trenche, in La Tuque (urban agglomeration), Mauricie, Québec
 River Trenche, a tributary of the Saint-Maurice River, Québec
 Central Trenche, an hydroelectric dam located on the Saint-Maurice River in La Tuque, in Upper-Mauricie, Québec
 Lac de la Trenche, in La Tuque, Mauricie, Québec
 Lake Trenche (Lac-Ashuapmushuan), Lac-Ashuapmushuan, Le Domaine-du-Roy Regional County Municipality, Québec

France
 La Tranche-sur-Mer, a seaside resort in southern Vendée, near La Rochelle region of Pays de la Loire

See also 
 Tranche